Lumba-Bayabao, officially the Municipality of Lumba-Bayabao (Maranao: Inged a Lumba-Bayabao), is a 2nd class municipality in the province of Lanao del Sur, Philippines. According to the 2020 census, it has a population of 45,909 people.

Geography

Barangays
Lumba-bayabao is politically subdivided into 39 barangays.

Climate

Demographics

Economy

References

External links
 Lumba-Bayabao Profile at the DTI Cities and Municipalities Competitive Index
 [ Philippine Standard Geographic Code]
 Philippine Census Information
 Local Governance Performance Management System

Municipalities of Lanao del Sur